U.S. soldiers were committing rape against French women during and after the liberation of France in the later stages of World War II. The sociologist J. Robert Lilly of Northern Kentucky University estimates that U.S. servicemen committed around 4,500 rapes in France between June 1944 and the end of the war in May 1945.

Background

The invasion of Normandy in June and a second invasion in the south in August, put over two million front line and support troops of the Western Allies into France in 1944.

The Liberation of Paris followed on 25 August. Except for German forces penned in the south-west (e.g., around Bordeaux) or in ports, the majority of German troops were pushed back to the Siegfried Line by the end of 1944. After the war, the repatriation for demobilisation of the troops took time. Even in 1946, months after VE-day, there were still about 1.5 million troops in Europe. The housing and management of the thousands of troops awaiting embarkation on a ship for home was a problem.

Life magazine reported the widespread view among American troops of France as "a tremendous brothel inhabited by 40 million hedonists who spent all their time eating, drinking, making love, and, in general, having a hell of a good time".

French complaints

By the late summer of 1944, soon after the invasion of Normandy, women in Normandy began to report rapes by American soldiers. Hundreds of cases were reported.

In 1945, after the end of the war in Europe, Le Havre was filled with American servicemen awaiting return to the States. A Le Havre citizen wrote to the mayor that the people of Le Havre were "attacked, robbed, run over both on the street and in our houses" and "This is a regime of terror, imposed by bandits in uniform." A coffeehouse owner from Le Havre testified, "We expected friends who would not make us ashamed of our defeat. Instead, there came only incomprehension, arrogance, incredibly bad manners and the swagger of conquerors." Such behavior also was common in Cherbourg. One resident stated that "With the Germans, the men had to camouflage themselves—but with the Americans, we had to hide the women."

U.S. troops committed 208 rapes and about 30 murders in the department of Manche.

U.S. military response

A brothel, the "Blue and Gray Corral", was set up near the village of St. Renan in September 1944 by Major General Charles H. Gerhardt, commander of the 29th Infantry Division, partly to counter a wave of rape accusations against American soldiers. It was shut down after a mere five hours in order to prevent civilians in the United States from finding out about a military-run brothel.

The Free French Forces high command sent a letter of complaint to the Supreme Commander Allied Expeditionary Force General Dwight D. Eisenhower. He gave his commanders orders to take action against all allegations of murder, rape, assault, robbery and other crimes. In August 1945, Pierre Voisin, mayor of Le Havre urged Colonel Thomas Weed, U.S. commander in the region, to set up brothels outside Le Havre. However, U.S. commanders refused.

White American soldiers were much less likely to be executed for rape. 130 of the 153 troops disciplined for rape by the Army were African American. U.S. forces executed 29 soldiers for rape, 25 of them African American. Many convictions against African Americans were based on circumstantial evidence. For example, Marie Lepottevin identified William Downes only because he was "much larger" than the other soldiers.

Historical and criminological studies

According to Alice Kaplan, an American historian of France and chair of the Department of French at Yale University, the U.S. military tolerated rape of French women less than that of German women. She argued that the number of rapes is well documented and is less than that of some other armies during that era, writing that "Nine hundred and four American soldiers were tried for rape in Europe, and even if the actual numbers were much higher, they do not compare with a terrible legacy of World War II-era rapes" committed, for example, by the Japanese in Nanking, by Germans in the German-occupied areas, by the French-Moroccans in Italy and by the Soviet soldiers across Eastern Europe and Germany. J. Robert Lilly, Regents professor of sociology and criminology at Northern Kentucky University, reported in Taken by Force: Rape and American GIs in Europe in World War II his estimate that 14,000 rapes were committed by U.S. soldiers in France, Germany and the United Kingdom between 1942 and 1945. More specifically, Lilly estimated that U.S. servicemen committed around 3,500 rapes in France between June 1944 and the end of the war.

See also
War rape
Allied forces
Rape during the occupation of Poland
Rape during the occupation of Germany
Rape during the occupation of Japan
Axis forces
Comfort women
German military brothels in World War II

References

Further reading

External links
Author Interview:Mary Louise Roberts, National Public Radio, May 31, 2013

France in World War II
Aftermath of World War II in France
Wartime sexual violence
France–United States relations
Rape in France
Wartime sexual violence in World War II
War crimes by the United States during World War II
Le Havre
Military scandals
War crimes in France
United States military scandals
Violence against women in France
African-American history of the United States military
History of women in France